Diego and Glot (sometimes stylized as Diego & Glot) is a Chilean animated series created by Claudio Kreutzberger in 2005, with the collaboration of Sebastián Correa and José Tomás Correa of CuboNegro studios, for Canal 13. Diego and Glot is the first hand-draw animation TV series made in Chile since the Condorito shorts in the 1980s (excluding Villa Dulce, which was released before Diego and Glot, but it was made with CGI). Satirical humor, cultural references and real famous public people of the country is recurrently featured in the show.

Since its debut on September 3, 2005 the show aired two seasons consisting of 20 episodes. In 2005, CuboNegro announced that they were working on a feature-length film, though a film was never released.

Overview

Diego y Glot takes place in Santiago, Chile and shows the Plá Perez, a dysfunctional family center on the youngest child, Diego Plá, and his pet, a green quiltro dog named Glot. Original creator Claudio Kreutzberger designed Diego and Glot as a "reflection of the modern Chilean youth".

Characters

Plá Perez Family
Diego Plá Perez (voiced by Rodolfo Vásquez): a 10-year-old kid. He owns a great imagination and is very anxious. He does everything for fulfill his dreams and wishes, even if that attracts problems to his family.
Glot (voiced by Dan Rodriguez): a 2 years old green quiltro dog. He is Diego's best friend.
Armando Pla (voiced by Cristían Carvajal): the father of Diego and Lalo. He calls himself a "frustrated painter" and, for that reason, he became a cartoonist. He works for the "La Ración" newspaper (a parody of La Nación).
Esmirna Pérez (voiced by Marcela Arroyave): the mother of Diego and Lalo. She is very hyperactive and extraspilled.
Lalo (voiced by Eduardo Valenzuela): Diego's older brother. He is popular with the girls and somewhat lazy. His dream is to become a rockstar.
Abuela Margarita (voiced by Soledad Guerrero): Diego's paternal grandmother. She is considered "crazy" by his family. She suffers from Alzheimer's disease.

Diego's Friends
Ismael Droguett (voiced by René Pinochet): He is very intelligent and helps Diego to find ingenious solutions to his problems.
Danilo Paniagua (voiced by Vanesa Silva): A fat friend of Diego. He is very disorderly and find a lot of problems easily.
Violeta Ochoa (voiced by Viviana Navarro): A girl and Diego's friend from school. She is very cute and is mostly the center of attention of Diego's friends because of her beauty. She loves soccer and lives on the same street of Diego.

Others 

José (voiced by Sandro Larenas)
Don Rudén (voiced by Juan Quezada
Inspector Cáceres (voiced by Sebastián Correa)
Dueño de Avasallador (voiced by Jaime Alfredo Nuñez)

Guest Stars 
Los Prisioneros
Iván Zamorano
Aldo Schiappacasse
Luciano Bello''
Florcita Motuda
Don Francisco
Pedro Carcuro
Ricardo Lagos
Raúl Hasbún
Julio Martínez
Mario Banderas

Production

Diego y Glot uses a sitcom style of storyboards and was heavily inspired by other animated series that lampoon aspects of the human condition, specially The Simpsons and Hey Arnold!. Diego and Glot also uses "guest stars" or cameo appearances of famous people or groups in Chile, like the music band Los Prisioneros, ex-Chilean president Ricardo Lagos or TV animator Don Francisco.

The first season consist of 10 chapters transmitted between September 3 and October 1, 2005 on the Chilean TV station Canal 13. The second season started on July 13, 2009.

 Episodes 

First season (2005)

Second season (2009)

Planned film

On September 13, 2005, Canal 13 confirmed the production of a feature-length movie based on Diego and Glot with the help of Canal 13 Films, who also worked with Cine Animadores on Papelucho and the Martian and Pulentos: The Movie''. The film was originally produced for release in 2007, nevertheless the opening was delayed indefinitely. As of 2009, the release date hasn't been confirmed.

References

External links 
 Diego y Glot Official website
 

2005 Chilean television series debuts
2000s animated television series
Chilean animated television series
Chilean children's animated comedy television series
Animated satirical television series
Animated television series about children
Animated television series about dogs
Animated television series about dysfunctional families